Independence High School is a public, co-educational high school located in Bakersfield, California. Its athletics are known as the Independence Falcons and the school colors are maroon and silver. Independence High School had their first class in 2008, with the first graduating class in 2011. The first all four year graduating class graduated in 2012. The school is well known for hosting The Ready Set and Carly Rae Jepsen as a school spirit competition win from Kelly 95.3. It currently contains an approximate 1,900 of students and staff.

Academics 
Independence High School offers AP, GATE, and Honor’s courses. AP courses are popular within the school to receive college credit with the College Board AP testing:
AP Calculus
AP English Language and Composition
AP English Literature and Composition
AP Environmental Science
AP European History
AP Government & Economics
AP Spanish Language
AP Spanish Literature
AP Statistics
AP United States History
GATE Advanced Algebra
GATE Freshman English
GATE Geometry
GATE Sophomore English
GATE Physics
Honor’s Chemistry
Honor's French
Honor’s Math Analysis
Honor's Spanish Language
Honor's U.S History
Honor's World History

References

External links 
Independence High School

High schools in Bakersfield, California
Educational institutions established in 2008
Public high schools in California
2008 establishments in California